Judith Herbison (born 26 December 1971) is a former Irish international cricketer who played for the Irish national team between 1990 and 1997. A right-handed medium-pace bowler, she played in 25 One Day International (ODI) matches, including at the 1993 World Cup.

Herbison was born in Antrim, Northern Ireland. Her senior debut for Ireland came at the 1990 European Cup, against Denmark. Against the same team at the 1991 European Championship, she took what were to be the best figures of her ODI career, 3/29 from 11 overs. At the 1993 World Cup in England, Herbison played in all seven of her team's matches, taking four wickets at an average of 56.75. Her best figures at that tournament were 2/25 against Australia. Herbison remained a regular in Irish sides for several more years, playing her final ODIs against South Africa in August 1997. At the 1995 European Cup, which Ireland hosted, she served as vice-captain to Miriam Grealey.

References

External links

1971 births
Living people
Cricketers from Northern Ireland
Ireland women One Day International cricketers
Irish women cricketers
People from Antrim, County Antrim
Sportspeople from County Antrim